Marjorie Donnelly (1917–1991), known as Morwenna Donnelly, was a British writer who won the John Llewellyn Rhys Prize in 1942 for her "book-length poem" Beauty and Ashes.

Poet Sidney Keyes reviewed Beauty and Ashes in the periodical Kingdom Come and wrote that "like Rilke she is finally answered, and accepts the revelation. That is the important fact"; comparing her favourably to Rainer Maria Rilke.

In 1967, she sent a letter to the editor to The Times in defense of The Sound of Music, which the newspaper had criticised as appealing "mainly to simple housewives or those living in unlovely surroundings." She wrote, "It is certainly happy, beautiful and gay; but it also reiterates the fact that individuals can solve their problems, and face danger and disaster, if they stand on firm ground and not on a spiritual quagmire of rotten values. I suggest it is this positive and hopeful note which strikes such a deep chord in audiences. " She listed her address as Ashdon Hall, in Saffron Walden, Essex.

References

1917 births
1991 deaths
Date of birth missing
Date of death missing
British women poets
John Llewellyn Rhys Prize winners
People from Saffron Walden